The first season of Os Caras de Pau was aired between April 4, 2010, and December 26, 2010, beginning with the episode "Ovos do ofício" and ending with the episode "Um Natal sem Lembranças".

Cast

Principal

Secondary

Episodes 

Os Caras de Pau